Harprasad Das Jain College  or Jain College or H.D. Jain College is a constituent college of Veer Kunwar Singh University situated in Arrah town of Bihar. It was founded in 1942 and was the first institution of higher learning set up  in Western Bihar.

History 
Established in 1942, this is the one of the oldest colleges of Bihar. It was founded by Adi Nath Trust which was formed by Har Prasad Das Jain. Earlier it was affiliated to Patna University but now it is affiliated colleges of Veer Kunwar Singh University.

Notable faculty

 Dinesh Nandan Sahay

References

Veer Kunwar Singh University
Arrah
Universities and colleges in Bihar
Educational institutions established in 1942
1942 establishments in India